Antigastra morysalis is a moth in the family Crambidae. It was described by Francis Walker in 1859. It is found in South Africa.

References

Spilomelinae
Endemic moths of South Africa
Moths described in 1859
Taxa named by Francis Walker (entomologist)